Lippiatt is a surname. Notable people with the surname include:

Harry Lippiatt (1917–1997), Australian rules footballer 
Ken Lippiatt (1920–2013), Australian rules footballer

See also
Lippitt